The 2003–04 Coppa Italia was the 57th edition of the tournament. Lazio won the tournament for the 4th time in club history, winning the two-legged final over Juventus on a 4–2 aggregate score.

Seedings and format
In the 2003–04 Coppa Italia there were a total of 48 teams competing: all 18 clubs from Serie A, 23 of the 24 clubs in Serie B, and 7 clubs from Serie C. The only Serie B club not to feature in the competition was ACF Fiorentina, as they had only later been reassigned to Serie B based on sporting merit following the disbarment of Cosenza.  The clubs from Serie C included the 4 runners-up from the 2002–03 Serie C promotion playoffs along with the two finalists from the 2002–03 Serie C Coppa Italia competition.

The format for pairings were:
 Group Stage: one-leg fixtures
 First round: The 32 non-seeded clubs were divided into 8 groups of 4 teams each.  Each team played the other three from its group once and the top team from each group advanced to the second round.
Points were awarded as 3 points for a win, 1 point for a draw, and 0 points for loss.  In the event of a tie at the conclusion of this stage, the group goes to the team with the best goal difference in the match, otherwise the best overall goal difference.
 Knockout Rounds: two-leg fixtures
 Second round:  Clubs 9–14 from Serie A and the top two clubs from Serie B were paired against the 8 advancing teams from the group stage.
 Round of 16: Teams 1–8 from Serie A were paired against the 8 winners of the second round
 Quarterfinals, Semifinals and Finals: Two-leg fixtures with pairings based upon bracket

Group stage
To protest against the enlargement of Serie B to 24 teams, many clubs chose to forfeit games in the group phase of this year's competition and many games were not played.  All forfeiting teams were given a 3–0 defeat and deducted 1 point in the table for each game not played.  Forfeiting teams are indicated in italics.

Group 1

Group 2

Group 3

Group 4

Group 5

Group 6

Group 7

Group 8

Knockout stage

Final

First leg

Second leg

Lazio won 4–2 on aggregate.

Top goalscorers

References
rsssf.com

Coppa Italia seasons
Italy
Coppa Italia